Michele De Agostini (born 27 November 1983) is an Italian former footballer who played as a defender.

Club career
He made his professional debut in the 2005–06 season in Serie B with Triestina. He played the next 14 seasons of his career in third and fourth tier, before returning to Serie B with Pordenone for the 2019–20 season at the age of 35.

On 29 August 2020 he left the Neroverdi.

On 17 September 2020 he joined Serie D club Cjarlins Muzane.

Personal life
His father Luigi De Agostini was an Italian international footballer, won UEFA Cup with Juventus and played at the 1990 FIFA World Cup where Italy finished third.

References

External links
 

1983 births
Sportspeople from Udine
Living people
Italian footballers
Association football defenders
U.S. Triestina Calcio 1918 players
Aurora Pro Patria 1919 players
A.C. Prato players
S.S. Ischia Isolaverde players
Pordenone Calcio players
Serie B players
Serie C players
Serie D players
Footballers from Friuli Venezia Giulia